Michael Newbold Castle (born July 2, 1939) is an American lawyer and politician who was governor of Delaware (1985–92) and the U.S. representative for  (1993–2011). He is a member of the Republican Party.

The district includes the entire state of Delaware and is the oldest intact surviving district in the nation. He was the longest-serving U.S. Representative in the state's history. Before his election to Congress, Castle served as a member of the Delaware General Assembly, starting in the State House of Representatives (1966–67) and then in the State Senate (1968–76). He was the 20th lieutenant governor of Delaware from 1981 to 1985, and the 69th governor of Delaware from 1985 to 1992.

On October 6, 2009, Castle announced his candidacy in the 2010 special election for the seat in the United States Senate held by Democrat Ted Kaufman. Kaufman, appointed by Governor Ruth Ann Minner to fill the vacancy created by Joe Biden (who resigned to become vice president of the United States), was not a candidate in the election. The election determined who would fill the balance of Biden's term, which ended on January 3, 2015. In one of the most surprising election results of 2010, Castle lost the Republican primary to Christine O'Donnell. He would have been heavily favored in the general election against Democrat Chris Coons, who defeated O'Donnell by 17 percentage points.

Castle is a member of the ReFormers Caucus of Issue One.

Early life and education
Castle was born in Wilmington, Delaware, the son of Louisa Johnston (née Bache) and James Manderson Castle, Jr. One of his maternal great-great-grandfathers was Virginia Senator John W. Johnston, and Castle's fifth great-grandfathers were founding fathers Benjamin Franklin and Daniel Carroll. Castle's father was a patent lawyer for DuPont, a firm so central to the city that it was long known in Wilmington simply as "the company." After graduating from Tower Hill School in 1957, he attended Hamilton College in Clinton, Oneida County, New York. He earned a Bachelor of Science degree in economics from Hamilton in 1961. While at Hamilton, Castle was a brother of the Alpha Delta Phi fraternity.

In 1964, he earned a Juris Doctor degree from Georgetown University Law Center in Washington, D.C. He was admitted to both the Delaware Bar and the Washington, D.C. Bar that same year.

Family
Michael Castle and Jane DiSabatino married on May 23, 1992; they have no children. Both are Roman Catholics.

Professional and political career
Following his admission to the bar, Castle returned to Wilmington and joined Connolly, Bove and Lodge, working as an associate (1964–1973) and later partner (1973–1975). A Republican, he served as Deputy Attorney General of Delaware from 1965 to 1966, and was elected to the Delaware House of Representatives in 1966. He served as a state representative for two years before winning a seat in the Delaware Senate, where he remained for eight years. He also served as minority leader from 1975 to 1976.

In 1976, Castle left the state legislature and returned to the full-time practice of law, founding his own firm with Carl Schnee (who was later nominated as U.S. Attorney for the District of Delaware by President Bill Clinton in 1999). He returned to politics in 1980, when he was recruited to run for Lieutenant Governor of Delaware by Governor Pete du Pont. He defeated Democratic state senator Thomas B. Sharp, with 59% to 40% of the vote. He served from 1981 to 1985, and headed panels on education and drunk driving.

Governor of Delaware

As the hand-picked choice of the popular Governor du Pont, he easily won election as Governor of Delaware, defeating former Delaware Supreme Court Justice William T. Quillen. In the campaign, Castle was criticized for being a shadow of his mentor and only promising an extension of du Pont's program. Delaware voters however elected him to another term in 1988 when he defeated Democrat Jacob Kreshtool by a wide margin, and is the last time a Republican won a governor election in the state. Castle served two terms, cutting the second one slightly short when he resigned to begin his first term as U.S. Representative.

U. S. House of Representatives

Committee assignments
 Committee on Education and Labor
 Subcommittee on Early Childhood, Elementary and Secondary Education (Ranking Member)
 Subcommittee on Higher Education, Lifelong Learning, and Competitiveness
 Committee on Financial Services
 Subcommittee on Capital Markets, Insurance, and Government-Sponsored Enterprises
 Subcommittee on Financial Institutions and Consumer Credit
 Subcommittee on Domestic Monetary Policy and Technology

In 1992, Castle could not run again for Governor, due to constitutional term limits. The result was what became known as "the Swap." Castle ran for the seat of U.S. Representative Tom Carper and Carper ran for Governor. Delaware's political leadership had quietly worked out the arrangement and retained the services of two very popular office holders.

Castle was first elected U.S. Representative in 1992, defeating former Lieutenant Governor Shien Biau Woo. Since then, he won election by wide margins eight times, defeating Democrats Carol Ann DeSantis in 1994, Dennis E. Williams in 1996 and 1998, Michael C. Miller in 2000 and 2002, Paul Donnelly in 2004, Dennis Spivack in 2006, and Karen Hartley-Nagle in 2008.

Castle was the co-chair of several Congressional caucuses, including the Diabetes Caucus, the Community College Caucus, the Biomedical Research Caucus and the Passenger Rail Caucus. He was also considered one of the most moderate Republicans in the U.S. House. In the wake of Tom DeLay's indictment in September 2005, liberal columnist E.J. Dionne named Castle as one of four lawmakers capable of leading an anticorruption reform of the Republican Party. Castle was a member of various liberal Republican Organizations, such as Republicans For Environmental Protection, The Republican Majority For Choice, Republicans For Choice, and Christine Todd Whitman's Its My Party Too. He is pro-choice and supports some gun control measures. He voted against a constitutional amendment that would have banned same-sex marriage. The non-partisan National Journal gave Mike Castle an ideological composite score of 59% conservative and 41% liberal.

Castle's centrist positions served him well in a state that trended increasingly Democratic during his tenure in the House.  Delaware had long been reckoned as a bellwether, but has voted Democratic in every presidential election since 1992, due almost entirely to heavily Democratic New Castle County.  At the same time, his centrist record made him the target of conservative groups such as Club for Growth, who ranked him the least conservative Republican in the U.S. House in 2008, and RemoveRINOs, who, in April 2010, named him the Ace of Spades on its most-wanted list.

In February 2004, Castle sponsored H.R. 3831 to reauthorize the assault weapons ban of 1994. The bill was co-sponsored by 11 Republican colleagues and 129 Democrats. In June 2008, Rep. Mark Kirk, R-IL, introduced H.R. 6257 to reinstate the ban, and Castle was one of the bill's four Republican co-sponsors. Both bills died in committee.

Castle cosponsored the Stem Cell Research Enhancement Act. The bill proposed expanding the number of embryonic stem cell lines that are eligible for federally funded research, expecting that this funding would generate more research and ultimately greater progress in developing new treatments for a wide range of medical conditions. Presently, the only embryonic stem cell lines eligible for federal funded research were derived before August 9, 2001. This legislation removes that date restriction, along with proposing stronger ethical requirements. After successfully passing both the U.S. Senate and the U.S. House, it received U.S. President George W. Bush's first presidential veto in July 2006.

In December 2010, Castle was one of fifteen Republican House members to vote in favor of repealing the United States military's "Don't Ask, Don't Tell" ban on openly gay service members.

During his term in Congress, Castle was known for his interest in numismatics. In 1995, he authored the legislation that created the American Platinum Eagle platinum bullion coin. He later sponsored the legislation that created the 50 State quarters, Sacagawea dollar, presidential dollar coins, and America the Beautiful quarters programs, and several commemorative coins. His activity led the Numismatic Guaranty Company to deem him "The Coinage Congressman." Castle drafted one sentence of the 1997 Omnibus Consolidated Appropriations Act: "Notwithstanding any other provision of law, the Secretary of the Treasury may mint and issue platinum coins in such quantity and of such variety as the Secretary determines to be appropriate." His intent was to make it easier for the Treasury to mint platinum coins for the coin collector market, but the sentence allows the Treasury Department to mint platinum coinage in any denomination. In the event that Congress refused to raise the U.S. debt ceiling, the Treasury could thus mint a trillion-dollar coin to avoid default. This maneuver has been proposed by some commentators, but has never been done.

Castle suffered two minor strokes during the 2006 campaign, but fully recovered. Considering the general Democratic sweep of other offices, he won the election comfortably, but with a greatly reduced margin over previous years. Despite the increased Democratic sweep of the 2008 election, he, unlike many Republicans, managed to increase his margin of victory, winning over Democratic challenger Karen Hartley-Nagle by 23 points. Considering his moderate profile, popularity, and long history of service to the state, his victory was not considered surprising. Castle appeared in the documentary, Keeping the Peace, which focused on Michael Berg's 'anti-war' campaign for Castle's congressional seat in 2006. It premiered at the Philadelphia Independent Film Festival in 2009 and won the Audience Award.

On November 9, 2009, Congressman Castle's District was profiled by Stephen Colbert in his segment "Better Know a District."

2010 Senate campaign

In 2010, Congressman Castle ran to be the Republican candidate to fill the seat of former Senator Joe Biden, who had become Vice President on January 20, 2009. Castle was defeated in the Republican primary on September 14, 2010, by Christine O'Donnell, the Tea Party favorite. The primary drew 57,000 voters, a small slice of the overall electorate. After the primary, Fairleigh Dickinson University's PublicMind twice polled Delaware voters, running a hypothetical match-up between Castle and the Democratic candidate, Chris Coons; in it, Castle beat Coons by a 21-point margin (54%–34%) and also had a favorable rating of 48% compared to O'Donnell's 34%. Castle refused to support O'Donnell in the Senate campaign against Coons.  Coons went on to defeat O'Donnell decisively in the general election.

In June 2010, Castle was one of only two Republicans to vote in favor of the DISCLOSE Act, intended to limit spending on political campaigns by corporations in the wake of the Supreme Court's decision in Citizens United v. Federal Election Commission. The bill requires added disclosure for political spending by corporations and prohibits some corporate political spending.

Town hall
A town hall style meeting organized by Castle to discuss health care reform with constituents was featured on the Drudge Report with the headline "VIDEO: Congressman's town hall erupts over Obama birth certificate ...". The story was linked to a tape documenting a few minutes of the event and hosted on YouTube. The incident sparked discussion of the topic in relation to the moderate Republican congressman and commentators' surprise at the audience reaction. Castle was heckled and booed after calmly responding to a protester, "If you're referring to the President there, he is a citizen of the United States."

Reporting in the international press on the explosion of interest in the subject focused on the central role of the Castle incident. The British newspaper The Guardian reported:But the real impact has been a video that has garnered hundreds of thousands of hits on the web (in which Congressman) Mike Castle, address(es) a town hall meeting on health care in Delaware last month when a woman suddenly stands up waving a bunch of papers ... The encounter was a warning to Republican officials how far the conspiracy theory has permeated parts of their party.

Almanac
Elections are held the first Tuesday after November 1. Members of the Delaware General Assembly take office the second Tuesday of January. State Senators have a four-year term and State Representatives have a two-year term. The Governor and Lieutenant Governor take office the third Tuesday of January and have four-year terms. U.S. Representatives take office January 3 and have a two-year term.

Electoral history

References

Sources

Images
 Profile, Biographical Directory of the U.S. Congress; accessed June 16, 2017.

External links

 

 Delaware's Governors
 Profile at SourceWatch
 News Meat

|-

|-

|-

|-

|-

|-

|-

|-

1939 births
21st-century American politicians
American Roman Catholics
Carroll family
Catholics from Delaware
Delaware lawyers
Republican Party Delaware state senators
Franklin family
Georgetown University Law Center alumni
Republican Party governors of Delaware
Hamilton College (New York) alumni
Lieutenant Governors of Delaware
Living people
Republican Party members of the Delaware House of Representatives
People from Wilmington, Delaware
Republican Party members of the United States House of Representatives from Delaware
Tower Hill School alumni
Members of Congress who became lobbyists